Jimmye McFarland Laycock (born February 6, 1948) is a former American football coach.  He served as the head football coach at the College of William & Mary from 1980 through 2018, retiring with the third-longest continuous head coaching tenure in NCAA Division I football history. He amassed an overall record of 249 wins, 194 losses, and two ties. Laycock graduated from William & Mary in 1970 and played quarterback under legendary coaches Marv Levy and Lou Holtz. Prior to taking over the Tribe head coaching position, Laycock coached at Newport News High School, Clemson University, The Citadel, and the University of Memphis.

Laycock has been the most successful head coach in the history of William & Mary Tribe football, leading the team to 24 winning seasons and 12 post-season appearances, including two national playoff semi-final appearances in 2004 and 2009. In 2010, he recorded his 200th win as an FCS head coach, making him only the third to reach that mark.

Personal
Laycock is from Hamilton, Virginia. He attended Loudoun Valley High School and lettered in football, basketball and baseball. He earned 12 varsity letters and had his football jersey number retired. He was also inducted into the Loudoun Valley High School Athletic Hall of Fame. In 2010, he was selected to the Hampton Roads Sports Hall of Fame, honoring those who have contributed to sports in southeastern Virginia. He was inducted into that Hall of Fame in October 2010. Today, he is married to Deidre Connelly, a sports psychology consultant at William & Mary. He has four children — three with Connelly.

Head coaching record

See also
 List of college football coaches with 200 wins
 List of college football coaches with 150 NCAA Division I FCS wins
 List of college football coaches with 100 losses

Notes

References

External links
 William & Mary profile

1948 births
Living people
American football quarterbacks
The Citadel Bulldogs football coaches
Clemson Tigers football coaches
Coaches of American football from Virginia
High school football coaches in Virginia
Memphis Tigers football coaches
People from Hamilton, Virginia
Players of American football from Virginia
Sportspeople from the Washington metropolitan area
William & Mary Tribe football coaches
William & Mary Tribe football players